Anders (Antti) August Kinnunen (19 May 1903 – 16 January 1979) was a Finnish farmer and politician, born in Saloinen. He was a member of the Parliament of Finland from 1951 to 1958 and again from 1962 to 1970, representing the Finnish People's Democratic League (SKDL).

References

1903 births
1979 deaths
People from Raahe
People from Oulu Province (Grand Duchy of Finland)
Finnish People's Democratic League politicians
Members of the Parliament of Finland (1951–54)
Members of the Parliament of Finland (1954–58)
Members of the Parliament of Finland (1962–66)
Members of the Parliament of Finland (1966–70)